Fritiof Björkén (born 3 January 1991) is a Swedish footballer who plays for IF Brommapojkarna.

Career

Trelleborgs FF
On 9 December 2019 it was confirmed, that Björkén had joined Trelleborgs FF on a one-year deal.

References

External links 
 

Swedish footballers
1991 births
Living people
Allsvenskan players
Superettan players
Ettan Fotboll players
Lunds BK players
Östers IF players
IF Brommapojkarna players
Trelleborgs FF players
Association football midfielders